The semicollared flycatcher (Ficedula semitorquata) is a small passerine bird in the Old World flycatcher family, one of the four species of Western Palearctic black-and-white flycatchers. It breeds in montane forests of the southeastern corner of Europe (Balkan Peninsula) to Northwest Iran. It is migratory, wintering in Central and Eastern Africa. It is a rare vagrant in western Europe. Tracking studies using geolocators have revealed that weather conditions during spring migration can have a large impact on the timing of Semicollared flycatcher migration and survival of adult birds.

This is a 12–13.5 cm long bird, intermediate in appearance between collared flycatcher and European pied flycatcher. It has often been classed as a subspecies of collared flycatcher.

The breeding male is mainly black above and white below, with a white half-collar, extending further back than in pied, large white wing patch, extensively white tail sides and a large white forehead patch. It has a pale grey rump. The bill is black and has the broad but pointed shape typical of aerial insectivores. It mainly takes insects in flight, rarely hunting caterpillars amongst the tree foliage like pied flycatcher.

Non-breeding male, females and juvenile semi-collared flycatchers have the black replaced by a pale brown, and may be very difficult to distinguish from other  Ficedula flycatchers, particularly the collared flycatcher. A distinction is that semicollared may show a white second wing bar, but many individuals are not separable in the field.

Semicollared flycatchers are birds of belts of deciduous woodlands, especially oak and hornbeam, in mountainous areas. They build an open nest in a native tree-holes and old nests of woodpeckers, also the species can occupy nest-boxes. The clutch size is 4-7 eggs. The song is again intermediate between collared and pied flycatchers, with slow strained whistles, but some rhythmic elements.

References

External links
  Semi-collared Flycatcher in Armenia, Armenian Bird Census Council

semicollared flycatcher
Birds of Europe
Birds of Western Asia
semicollared flycatcher